Cedar Creek is a stream in Winona County, in the U.S. state of Minnesota. It is a tributary of the Mississippi River.

Cedar Creek was named for the red cedar trees near the stream.

See also
List of rivers of Minnesota

References

Rivers of Winona County, Minnesota
Rivers of Minnesota